Jason Douglas Henderson (born September 4, 1971) is an American writer of computer games, novels and several comic book series.

He is the writer of the young adult novel series Alex Van Helsing from HarperCollins and the comic book series Sword of Dracula from Image Comics, Strange Magic from Marvel Comics, and Soulcatcher. His book Alex Van Helsing: Vampire Rising was added to the 2011 Texas Library Association Lone Star Reading List, a list of the top 20 books published in the previous year for middle grade readers.

He was the writer of Locus best-seller The Element of Fire, the first novel in the Highlander (franchise), and was a co-creator on the Tokyopop manga series Psy-comm. He hosts the cult film podcast Castle of Horror with manga collaborator Tony Salvaggio.

Personal life
Henderson currently resides in Colorado. He graduated from the University of Dallas in 1993 with a BA in History and from Catholic University's Columbus School of Law in 1996 with a Juris Doctor (JD) degree in Law.

Bibliography

Novels 

The Iron Thane, Baen Books, 1993.  
The Spawn of Loki, Baen Books, 1995.  
Highlander: the Element of Fire, Warner Aspect Books, 1995.  
The Incredible Hulk: Abominations, Berkley Books, 1997.  
X-Men/Spider-Man: Time’s Arrow, Book 1 (with Tom DeFalco), Berkley Books, 1998. 
The Darkling Band, Dragon Moon Press, 2007. 
Alex Van Helsing
Vampire Rising, HarperCollins, 2010. 
Voice of the Undead, HarperCollins, 2011. 
The Triumph of Death, HarperCollins, 2012. 
Young Captain Nemo
Young Captain Nemo, Feiwel & Friends, 2019. 
Quest for the Nautilus, Feiwel & Friends, 2020.

Graphic Novels 

Soulcatcher, Alias Comics, 2005. 
Vampire The Masquerade Volume 3: Blood and Loyalty (with Bryan Edwards, Mike Reynolds, Chris Marrinan, Steve Ellis), White Wolf, 2003. 
Sword of Dracula, IDW Comics, 2005. 
Hulk: Broken Worlds (with various), Marvel Comics, 2009. 
What If: Dark Reign, Marvel Comics, 2011. 
Shadowland: Daughters of the Shadow, Marvel Comics, 
Volume 1 (illustrated by Ivan Rodriguez), Marvel Comics, 2010.
Volume 2 (illustrated by Ivan Rodriguez), Marvel Comcis, 2010.
Volume 3 (illustrated by Ivan Rodriguez and Jean-Baptiste Andreae), Marvel Comcis, 2010.
Shadowland: Street Heroes (collects volumes 1-3 with various other comics), Marvel Comics, 2011. 
Psy-Comm (with Tony Salvaggio)
Volume 1 (illustrated by Shane Granger), Tokyopop, 2005. 
Volume 2 (illustrated by Ramanda Karmaga), Tokyopop, 2007. 
Volume 3 (illustrated by Ramanda Karmaga), Tokyopop/Right Stuf, 2012. 
Volume 1: Kaplan SAT/ACT Vocabulary-Building Manga, Tokyopop, 2007. 
Clockwerx (with Tony Salvaggio; illustrated by Jean-Baptiste Hostache)
Tome 1: Genese (French Language Version), Humanoids, 2008 (French). .
Tome 2: Deluge (French Language Version), Humanoids, 2009. 
Clockwerx Integral, Vol. 1 & 2 (English Language Version), Humanoids, 2013.

References

External links

Texas Library Association Lone Star Reading List 
McLatchy article on Alex Van Helsing, Jason Henderson and YA books for boys. 
Austin Chronicle article, "Overnight Sensation: 'Sword of Dracula' creator Jason Henderson is taking over the (fantasy) world
Radio interview, recorded in May 2010

20th-century American novelists
21st-century American novelists
American comics writers
American fantasy writers
American male novelists
People from Dallas
American science fiction writers
University of Dallas alumni
Columbus School of Law alumni
Living people
1971 births
20th-century American male writers
21st-century American male writers